Lejre Stadion is a football stadium that belongs to Danish Association football club FC Lejre. Lejre Stadion has a capacity of 5,300 and was built in 1989. The match with the highest attendance was in 2008, when 4,908 spectators saw the match between FC Lejre and FC Nordsjælland.

Sports venues completed in 1989
Sports venues in Denmark
1989 establishments in Denmark
Buildings and structures in Region Zealand